ISO 10012:2003, Measurement management systems - Requirements for measurement processes and measuring equipment is the ISO standard that specifies generic requirements and provides guidance for the management of measurement processes and metrological confirmation of measuring equipment used to support and demonstrate compliance with metrological requirements. It specifies quality management requirements of a measurement management system that can be used by an organization performing measurements as part of the overall management system, and to ensure metrological requirements are met.

ISO 10012:2003 is not intended to be used as a requisite for demonstrating conformance with ISO 9001, ISO 14001 or any other standard. Interested parties can agree to use ISO 10012:2003 as an input for satisfying measurement management system requirements in certification activities.

Other standards and guides exist for particular elements affecting measurement results, e.g. details of measurement methods, competence of personnel, and interlaboratory comparisons.

ISO 10012:2003 is not intended as a substitute for, or as an addition to, the requirements of ISO/IEC 17025.

Revisions
 ISO 10012-1:1992
 ISO 10012-2:1997

ISO 10012-1:1992
Quality assurance requirements for measuring equipment – Part 1: Metrological confirmation system for measuring equipment

Applies to: testing laboratories, including those providing a calibration service; suppliers of products or services; other organizations where measurement is used to demonstrate compliance with specified requirements.

ISO 10012-2:1997
Quality assurance for measuring equipment – Part 2: Guidelines for control of measurement processes

References
 ISO Catalogue in the ISO website

10012